Oak Brook College of Law and Government Policy is a correspondence law school in Fresno, California. It is not accredited but is registered with the State Bar of California and authorized to grant the degree of Juris Doctor. Graduates are therefore able to take the bar exam in California but may not be able to do so in other states. It was started in 1994 to "train individuals who desire to advance the gospel of Jesus Christ through service as advocates of truth, counselors of reconciliation, and ministers of justice in the fields of law and government policy."

Notable alumni
 Kristi Burton Brown - Chair of the Colorado Republican Party, 2021-
 Rachael Denhollander - First former gymnast to file a complaint against Larry Nassar; Nassar was later convicted of child molestation. She is currently director of marketing and recruiting.
 Josiah Magnuson - South Carolina state representative
 Andrew Matthews - Minnesota state senator
 Timmy Teepell - political consultant, Chief of Staff to Bobby Jindal

Notable faculty
 John Eidsmoe - constitutional scholar
 Eric Rucker - Kansas state senator

References

External links
 

Law schools in California
Unaccredited institutions of higher learning in California
Private universities and colleges in California
Education in Fresno, California
Distance education institutions based in the United States
1994 establishments in California
Educational institutions established in 1994